was a Japanese actress who began as a child actress and maintained her fame in a career that spanned 50 years. She is particularly known for her collaborations with directors Mikio Naruse and Keisuke Kinoshita, with Twenty-Four Eyes (1954) and Floating Clouds (1955) being among her most noted films.

Biography

Takamine was born in Hakodate, Hokkaidō, in 1924. At the age of four, following the death of her mother, she was placed in the care of her aunt in Tokyo. Her first role was in the Shochiku studio's 1929 film Mother (Haha), which brought her tremendous popularity as a child actor. Many of the films of her early career were imitations of Shirley Temple films.

After moving to the Toho studio in 1937, her dramatic roles in Kajirō Yamamoto's Tsuzurikata kyōshitsu (1938) and Horse (1941) brought her added fame as a girl star. She toured as a singer to entertain Japanese troops and, after the war, sang for American occupation troops in Tokyo. After initially appearing in a pro-union film, Those Who Make Tomorrow (1946), she became appalled by the rigid practices of the union's leaders and members and, during the post-war strikes at Toho, first joined a new union before moving to the new Shintoho studios in 1947.

In 1950, she left Shintoho and became a freelance actress. Her films with directors Keisuke Kinoshita and Mikio Naruse during the 1950s made her Japan's top star. Notable films of this decade include Kinoshita's satirical comedy Carmen Comes Home (1951), Japan's first feature length colour film, and the antiwar drama Twenty-Four Eyes (1954), and Naruse's Floating Clouds (1955) and When a Woman Ascends the Stairs (1960).

She was especially favoured as leading actress by Naruse, appearing in 17 of his films between 1941 and 1966, which are considered "some of her finest performances" (Jasper Sharp), with her "sensitive yet resourceful persona" proving ideal for "Naruse's suffering, persevering heroines" (Alexander Jacoby). Film historian Donald Richie described the characters she portrayed as follows: "Like so many Japanese women then, they wanted more out of life, but couldn’t get it. The war may have been over, women found, but they weren’t better off. They were still fairly unhappy. So the kind of roles Takamine played fit the zeitgeist, may have even made that zeitgeist." Comparing Naruse and Kinoshita, Takamine explained: "Though different in style, they shared a common aversion to things that were not natural. What I tried to do was to be as natural as women we see in the news, but adding a touch of drama so that I would be even more real."

She married writer-director Zenzo Matsuyama in 1955, but continued her acting career, stating that she wanted to "create a new style of wife who has a job". After retiring as an actress in 1979, she published her autobiography and several essay collections. She died of lung cancer on 28 December 2010 at the age of 86.

Selected filmography

{| class="wikitable sortable"
! Year
! Title
! Role
! Director(s)
! Notes
|-
| 1929
| Mother
| 
| Hōtei Nomura
| Film debut
|-
| 1931
| Tokyo Chorus
| 
| Yasujirō Ozu
|
|-
| 1938
| Tsuzurikata kyōshitsu
| 
| Kajirō Yamamoto
|
|-
| rowspan=2|1941
| Hideko the Bus Conductor
| Okoma
| Mikio Naruse
| First film with Naruse
|-
| Horse
| 
| Kajirō Yamamoto
| 
|-
| 1943
| Ahen senso
| 
| Masahiro Makino
|
|-
| rowspan=2|1946
| Those Who Make Tomorrow
| Takamine
| Akira KurosawaHideo SekigawaKajirō Yamamoto
|
|-
| Aru yo no tonosama
| 
| Teinosuke Kinugasa
|
|-
| 1949
| Ginza kankan musume
| 
| Koji Shima
| 
|-
| 1950
| The Munekata Sisters
| 
| Yasujirō Ozu
| 
|-
| 1951
| Carmen Comes Home
| Okin alias Lily Carmen
| Keisuke Kinoshita
| First film with Kinoshita
|-
| rowspan="2" | 1952
| Lightning
| 
| Mikio Naruse
| 
|-
|Carmen's Pure Love
|Carmen
|Keisuke Kinoshita
|
|-
| rowspan=2|1953
| Where Chimneys Are Seen
| 
| Heinosuke Gosho
|
|-
| [[The Wild Geese (1953 film)|The Wild Geese]]| Otama
| Shirō Toyoda
| 
|-
| rowspan=3|1954
| The Garden of Women| Yoshie Izushi
| Keisuke Kinoshita
| 
|-
| Twenty-Four Eyes| Hisako Ōishi
| Keisuke Kinoshita
| 
|-
| Somewhere Beneath the Wide Sky| 
| Masaki Kobayashi
| 
|-
| 1955
| Floating Clouds| 
| Mikio Naruse
| 
|-
| rowspan=2|1956
| Nagareru| 
| Mikio Naruse
| 
|-
| A Wife's Heart| 
| Mikio Naruse
| 
|-
| rowspan=2|1957
| Untamed| 
| Mikio Naruse
| 
|-
| Times of Joy and Sorrow| Kiyoko Arisawa
| Keisuke Kinoshita
| 
|-
| 1958
| Rickshaw Man| Yoshiko Yoshioka
| Hiroshi Inagaki
|
|-
| rowspan=3|1960
| When a Woman Ascends the Stairs| Keiko Yashiro
| Mikio Naruse
| 
|-
| Daughters, Wives and a Mother| 
| Mikio Naruse
| 
|-
| The River Fuefuki| Okei
| Keisuke Kinoshita
| 
|-
| rowspan=4|1961
| As a Wife, As a Woman| Miho Nishigaki
| Mikio Naruse
| 
|-
| Happiness of Us Alone| Akiko Katayama
| Zenzo Matsuyama
| 
|-
| The Human Condition: A Soldier's Prayer| 
| Masaki Kobayashi
|
|-
| Immortal Love| 
| Keisuke Kinoshita
| 
|-
| rowspan=2|1962
| Burari bura-bura monogatari| 
| Zenzo Matsuyama
|
|-
| A Wanderer's Notebook| 
| Mikio Naruse
| 
|-
| 1963
| A Woman's Story| 
| Mikio Naruse
| 
|-
| 1964
| Yearning| Reiko Morita
| Mikio Naruse
| 
|-
| 1967
| The Doctor's Wife| 
| Yasuzo Masumura
|
|-
| 1973
|The Twilight Years|
| Shirō Toyoda
|
|-
| 1979
| Oh, My Son!| 
| Keisuke Kinoshita
| Final film
|-
|}

Awards
Japan Academy Film Prize 
1996 Lifetime Achievement Award

Mainichi Film Concours for Best Actress
1955 Twenty-Four Eyes, Garden of Women, Somewhere Beneath the Wide Sky1956 Floating Clouds1958 Times of Joy and Sorrow, Untamed1962 Immortal Love, Happiness of Us AloneBlue Ribbon Award for Best Actress
1955 Twenty-Four Eyes, Garden of Women, Somewhere Beneath the Wide SkyKinema Junpo Award for Best Actress
1956 Floating Clouds''

References

External links

 
 
 

1924 births
2010 deaths
People from Hakodate
Deaths from lung cancer in Japan
20th-century Japanese actresses
Japanese child actresses
Japanese film actresses
Japanese autobiographers
Women autobiographers